Sportika is an Italian sports equipment manufacturing company based in Ovada. The company produces sportswear, mainly football kits, t-shirts, jackets, leggins, among other products.

History 
Sportika was founded in 1982 by Carlo Crosio who is a sports and sportswear enthusiast from Ovada. Over the years it grew to eventually supply kits for clubs at all levels of Italian football, the Albanian Premier League, and lower-level European football clubs.

Sponsorships

Basketball

Club teams 
  Gorica
  Taranto Cras Basket
  Fortitudo Basket Martina Franca
  Ravenna Basket
  Sandretto Basket Falconara

Beach soccer

Club teams 

 Pisa

Football

Club teams 

 Elbasani
 Bylis Ballsh
 Besa Kavajë
 Shkumbini Peqin
 KS Kamza
 KF Partizani
 HAKA United
 Chernomorets Burgas
 FC Germanea Sapareva Banya
 Digenis Voroklinis
 Digenis Morphou
 Enosis Neon Parekklisia
 Ethnikos Latsion
 Alessandria  (Female football)
 Aluntina
 Bisceglie
 Brindisi
 Ladispoli
 Montichiari
 Vigor Senigallia
 Al-Ansar SC
 Al-Safa' SC
 Birzebbuga St. Peters
 Marsaskala F.C.
   Akademija Pandev                         
 AGD Farminhão
 Sport Viseu e Benfica
 FK BCT Bratislava
 FK Humenné
 MFK Tatran Liptovský Mikuláš
 MFK Vranov nad Topľou
 NK Radomlje

Futsal

Club teams 

 Isolotto Firenze
 Virtus Roma Calcio
 Venezia

Volleyball

Club teams 

 Vibrotek Pulsano
 Hasta Volley

Rugby

National teams

Club teams 

  Udine

Handball

Club teams 

 HK Slavia Medik Martin

Floorball

National teams 

 Slovakia

Charity projects
 Progetto Buon Cammino 
 Nazionale Italiana DJ 
 Nazionale Italiana Artisti TV 
 LILT 
 Selezione Italiana Sacerdoti

References

External links
 

Sportswear brands
Sporting goods manufacturers of Italy
Italian brands